The 1962 World Sportscar Championship season was the 10th season of FIA World Sportscar Championship motor racing. It featured the 1962 International Championship for GT Manufacturers, which was contested in three engine capacity divisions, and the 1962 Coupe des Sports, which was contested in three engine capacity divisions. The season ran from 11 February 1962 to 21 September 1962 over 15 events.
For this season the FIA shifted the focus to production based GT cars and the World Sportscar Championship title was discontinued.
This was also the first year that each class had its own championship, instead of a single overall title.

Schedule

Although composed of 15 races, each class did not compete in all events.  Some events were for one class, while others were combined events.

Season results

Manufacturers' Championship
All championships scored points to the top six competitors in each class, in the order of 9-6-4-3-2-1.  Constructors were only awarded points for their highest finishing car. Other finishers from the same manufacturer were merely skipped in the points count.

Only the best 5 results counted towards the championship.  Points earned but not counted towards the championship total are listed in italics.

GT +2.0
This championship was for all GT class cars over 2000 cc.  GT +2.0 did not participate in Rounds 2, 4, 6, 10, 12, and 13.

GT 2.0
This championship was for all GT class cars under 2000 cc but above 1000 cc.  GT 2.0 did not participate in Rounds 2, 4, 6, 10, 12, and 14.

GT 1.0
This championship was for all GT class cars under 1000 cc.  GT 1.0 only participated in Rounds 2, 4, 6, 10, 12, and 13.

Coupe des Sports

S 3.0
This championship was for all Sportscar class cars under 3000 cc.  Sportscars only scored points in Rounds 3, 5, and 7. The last two rounds were won by the Ferrari 246 SP.

S 2.0
This championship was for all Sportscar class cars under 2000 cc but above 1000 cc.

Porsche was the only manufacturer to finish a race in this class in the three scoring rounds, and were declared the champion.

S 1.0
This championship was for all Sportscar class cars under 1000 cc.  Sportscars only scored points in Rounds 3, 5, and 7.

External links
 1962 World Sportscar Championship

 
World Sportscar Championship seasons
World Sportscar Championship